Ocean Man 69B is an Indian reserve of the Ocean Man First Nation in Saskatchewan.

References

Indian reserves in Saskatchewan
Division No. 1, Saskatchewan
Ocean Man First Nation